Morris H. Gross was a basketball player and coach, baseball coach, and college athletics administrator.  He served as the head basketball coach at San Diego State University from 1929 to 1942, compiling a record of 190–85.  Smith was also the head baseball coach at San Diego State from 1931 to 1932, tallying a mark of 10–6–1.  His 1940–41 basketball squad won the NAIA Men's Basketball Championship.  Gross served as an officer in the United States Navy during World War II.  In November 1944 he was assigned to coach the Saint Mary's Pre-Flight Air Devils basketball team.

References

Year of birth missing
Year of death missing
San Diego State Aztecs athletic directors
San Diego State Aztecs baseball coaches
San Diego State Aztecs men's basketball coaches
San Diego State Aztecs men's basketball players
United States Navy personnel of World War II
United States Navy officers
American men's basketball players